John Peacock (died 1867)  was a South Shields born songwriter and poet in the 19th century. His most famous piece is possibly  "Marsden Rocks".

Life 
John Peacock (died 1867) was born in South Shields.  He was born in the City of York in the year 1799
He went to sea at the age of 12 and was captured by the French during either the French Revolutionary Wars or, more likely, the Napoleonic Wars between France and Britain. 
He was a prisoner for several years being confined in a camp in northern France.  his ship the ' Neva' being captured by the French Privateer Maria Louisa
He was at various times a seaman, prisoner of war, ( in the French prison in the fortress of Cambray for four years ) shoemaker, Chartist, Co-operative storekeeper, and a second hand bookseller with premises in the Market Place, South Shields.  His address was number 2 George Street South Shields .
A description given in "The Weekly Chronicle" by Mr William Brockie in his regular column on "Local songs and songwriters" was of a man who was "sober, intelligent, sharp witted and well known".

He wrote several pieces of poetry, many of which appeared in "The Shields Garland" in 1859.

According to The Shields Daily News Monday 17 June 1867 he was seen to have fallen to his knees in the Market Place of South Shields and was reported to have died  ' of an attack of apoplexy ' by Dr Tosach ( as reported by the Shields Daily News.

Works 
These include :-

Marsden Rocks – to the tune of "Jockey to the Fair"
The Tallow Ship – tells the tale of the 600 tons of tallow candles, a must in every household before electricity, were washed ashore at South Shields, and how the population cleared the beach very quickly.

See also 
Geordie dialect words

References

External links
 FARNE - Folk Archive Resource North East – Marsden Rocks
 FARNE - Folk Archive Resource North East – The Tallow Ship
 Wor Geordie songwriters
Allan’s Illustrated Edition of Tyneside songs and readings

English male poets
English songwriters
People from South Shields
Musicians from Tyne and Wear
Writers from Tyne and Wear
1867 deaths
Geordie songwriters
Year of birth unknown